Azzam is a private super yacht built by German shipyard Lürssen Yachts. Azzam was launched on 5 April 2013. At  in length, it is the longest private motor yacht in the world. The yacht was delivered on 9 September 2013.

Engineering
Engineer Mubarak Saad al Ahbabi directed the construction of Azzam, with technical engineering by Lürssen Yachts including design by Nauta Yachts and interior design by Christophe Leoni. Following a year of engineering, the yacht was built in three years, which is a record building time according to Superyacht Times. Azzam possesses the ability to travel at high speed in shallow waters.

Features
It can travel in excess of  powered by a combination of two gas turbines and two diesel engines with a total power output of  through four pump-jets. Two of the pump-jets are non-movable round water outlets in the middle of the stern, and two with thrust vectoring capabilities using moveable duct water outlets positioned on either side of the non-movable ones.

At an estimated cost of $605 million, it cost approximately $100 million more than the third-largest private motor yacht, Eclipse.

Ownership and use
Azzam was commissioned by Khalifa bin Zayed Al Nahyan, president of the United Arab Emirates (until his death in 2022). The yacht is listed for charter without a price; however, according to Motor Boat & Yacht magazine, it is not available for charter; the charter listing, similar to Roman Abramovich's Eclipse, is aimed to avoid European taxation, as charter yachts are exempt from property tax.

References

Motor yachts
Ships built in Bremen (state)
2013 ships
Ships of the United Arab Emirates
Royal and presidential yachts